Liang Xueming (born 2 August 1995) is a Chinese footballer who currently plays for Meizhou Hakka in the Chinese Super League.

Club career
Liang Xueming was promoted to Guangzhou Evergrande's first team squad in 2015 season. On 13 May 2015, he made his senior debut in a 2–1 away loss against Xinjiang Tianshan Leopard in the 2015 Chinese FA Cup. He would go on to be loaned out to China League One side Guizhou Hengfeng Zhicheng for six months on 29 June 2016. He made his debut for Guizhou on 10 July 2016 in a 2–0 home win against Qingdao Huanghai, coming on as a substitute for Ilhamjan Iminjan in the 86th minute. On 17 July 2016, he scored his first senior goal and won a penalty in his second appearance for Guizhou, which ensured Guizhou's 4–1 win against Zhejiang Yiteng. Liang made ten appearances in the second half of 2016 season as Guizhou finished the runners-up of the league and won promotion to the first tier.

On 24 February 2017, Liang made a permanent transfer to Guizhou Hengfeng Zhicheng. He made his Super League debut on 3 March 2017 in a 1–1 home draw against Liaoning FC. On 24 June 2017, he scored his first Super League goal in a 2–2 away draw against Shandong Luneng Taishan. He scored his second goal of the season on 17 September 2017 in a 2–1 home win over Henan Jianye. Liang scored two goals in 21 league appearances in the 2017 season. On 2 May 2018, Liang came on substitute in the second half in the fifth round of 2018 Chinese FA Cup against his former club Guangzhou Evergrande. He missed a penalty in the 71st minute but scored the equalizer in the 87th minute as Guizhou Hengfeng eventually won the match in the penalty shootout.

Liang transferred to China League One side Beijing Sport University in February 2019. After only one season with the club he was allowed to leave for Meizhou Hakka on 24 February 2020. Making his debut in a league game on 13 September 2020 against Liaoning Shenyang Urban that ended in a 2-0 victory. After the game he would go on to establish himself as a vital member of the team that gained promotion to the top tier after coming second within the division at the end of the 2021 China League One campaign.

Career statistics
.

Honours

Club
Guangzhou Evergrande
AFC Champions League: 2015
Chinese Super League: 2015
Chinese FA Super Cup: 2016

References

External links
 

1995 births
Living people
Chinese footballers
Footballers from Guangzhou
People from Panyu District
Association football forwards
Chinese Super League players
China League One players
Guangzhou F.C. players
Guizhou F.C. players
Beijing Sport University F.C. players
Meizhou Hakka F.C. players